The Korean FA Cup is a national football cup knockout competition of South Korea, held annually by the Korea Football Association (KFA). Before the FA Cup was established in 1996, two predecessor competitions named All Joseon Football Tournament (1921–1940) and Korean National Football Championship (1946–2000) were played, but the FA Cup did not succeed their records. The winner qualifies to the next season's AFC Champions League group stage.

History

The All Joseon Football Tournament was founded by the Joseon Sports Council in 1921, during Japanese rule in Korea. Youth, student and adult football clubs from various provinces participated. After 1934, it became a part of the Korean National Sports Festival, which was the championship for various sports games and matched Koreans against other sports championships operated by Japanese who lived in Korea.  The Joseon Sports Council was disbanded in 1937, due to the Japanese government's oppression, and the Joseon Football Association (currently KFA) succeeded it after 1938, but was cancelled after 1940 for the same reason during World War II.

After the liberation of Korea, the KFA founded the National Football Championship and the President's Cup, entered by many semi-professional clubs and amateur clubs from all over South Korea. They opened in spring and late autumn each.

The National Football Championship declined after the founding of the K League, because professional clubs and famous players didn't take part in it. There were several efforts to make professional clubs join the tournament, and it became so successful that many top-rank clubs joined the championship, renamed "FA Cup", during 1988 and 1989 season. However, it soon returned to a semi-professional tournament in 1990, because of discord between the KFA and professional clubs. The current FA Cup separated from the National Championship in 1996, and two competitions merged again since 2001. The President's Cup was also abolished in 2010.

Format

1996–2005
The Korean FA Cup took place after the end of the regular K League season, and was usually completed over a short period. Games were played in a single-elimination format, with extra time and penalties if required. K League sides were seeded in the 1st round of the tournament proper, but all matches were played at neutral venues, such as Gimcheon and Namhae.

2006–present
To elevate the status of the tournament, matches were spread throughout the year. The 2006 edition, for example, started in early March, with rounds also held in April, July, August and November. The final was played in December. As in previous years, the competition was contested in a straight knockout format.

Sponsorship

Champions

List of finals

Titles by club

Awards

Most Valuable Player

Top goalscorer 
 If three or more players finished with the same number of goals as the top scorers, the award was not presented.

See also
 Football in South Korea
 List of Korean FA Cup winners
 Korean National Football Championship
 Korean President's Cup
 K League
 Korean League Cup
 Korean Super Cup

References

External links
Official website 
All-time champions at KFA 
Fixtures & Results at KFA 
South Korea - List of Cup Winners at RSSSF

 
National association football cups
1996 establishments in South Korea